The T sets, also referred to as the Tangara trains, are a class of electric multiple units that currently operate on the Sydney Trains network. Built by A Goninan & Co, the sets entered service between 1988 and 1995, initially under the State Rail Authority and later CityRail. The T sets were built as "third-generation" trains for Sydney's rail fleet, coinciding with the final withdrawals of the "Red Rattler" sets from service in the late 1980s and early 1990s. The Tangaras were initially built as two classes; the long-distance G sets and the suburban T sets, before being merged after successive refurbishments.

Design 

The Tangara is a double-deck four-car set, with the two outer cars being driving control trailers (carrying a D prefix) that are fitted with one pantograph each and the middle two cars being non-control motor cars (carrying an N prefix). All sets are equipped with chopper control.

Unlike most other Sydney Trains rolling stock, the seats on the suburban T sets are fixed, meaning that half the seats face backwards. Former G sets, however, do have reversible seats.

History

Initial delivery 

In July 1986, the Government of New South Wales awarded A Goninan & Co a contract for 450 carriages. In 1993, it was decided that the last 80 carriages of the order would be built to a modified design to operate peak-hour services to Wyong, Port Kembla and Dapto. In 1996, five spare driving trailers were ordered.

The Tangara name is of Aboriginal origin, meaning to go

Two subclasses of Tangara were built, the suburban sets targeted as T sets, and outer-suburban sets originally targeted as G sets. The T sets replaced the first generation of Sydney's electric rolling stock.

The G sets differed from the T sets in originally having manual door buttons, high-backed reversible seats, toilets, fresh water dispensers and luggage racks. Additionally, the G sets were delivered with a revised design at the front and rear of the train, notably an angular cutout in the bottom of their noses. Additionally, the pinstriped grey panels below the cab windows were replaced with light orange panels for improved visibility. All T sets have a number plate below a hundred while all G sets are numbered at or above

The first train (set T20) was unveiled at Sydney Central in December 1987, heavily promoted as the "train of the 21st century", operating a promotional service on 28 January 1988 targeted as TAN1, and entering regular service on 12 April 1988. The final T set (set T59, formerly T92) was delivered in February 1994 and the final G set (set T100, formerly G32) in October 1995.

The cars built were:
T set driving trailer cars: D6101-D6284 with additional spare cars D6285-D6289
T set non-driving motor cars: N5101-N5284 with additional spare car N5285
G set driving trailer cars: OD6801-OD6840 with additional spare car OD6841
G set non-driving motor cars: ON5801-ON5820
G set non-driving motor cars with toilet: ONL5851-ONL5870
Set G7 was fitted with an AC drive system for evaluation purposes with the existing DC stock and compatibility with signalling and communication systems on the network. G7 was scrapped in 2005 at Maintrain, Auburn after the Waterfall rail accident, as all four cars were beyond repair.

Upgrades in the early 2000s 

When first introduced, the T sets were fitted with passenger door release handles to prevent loss of air conditioning at stations. These were later disconnected (and later removed) due to passengers not getting used to opening the doors for themselves when needed. The seats originally had fabric upholstery, but this was gradually replaced by blue vinyl.

In the early 2000s, all Tangaras were updated with a new CityRail corporate appearance. This involved painting the passenger doors and much of the front and rear ends of the trains yellow. Blue and yellow stripes along the bottom of the carriages were replaced by a single yellow stripe and updated CityRail logos were placed on the driving cars.

In late 2005, 15 V set carriages were suddenly withdrawn due to the discovery of corrosion in their underframes. G sets began to operate more off-peak Intercity services to Port Kembla, Kiama, and Wyong to cover for the withdrawn V sets. H sets started entering service in December 2006. The newer trains feature a very similar level of passenger amenity to the G sets and can be seen as a continuation of the design. Their introduction lead to a change in the role of the G sets. From 2007, the G sets were progressively redeployed to suburban services, providing extra capacity on high-demand existing services such as on the Western line and allowing new services to be introduced. By 2008, G sets were often used on peak suburban services that extended into intercity areas, such as services to Springwood (via the Western line).

Conversion of G sets to T sets 

In 2009, the conversion of G sets to T sets began, to improve their suitability for suburban working as H sets took over their outer suburban duties. Conversion work consisted of the removal of toilets and their replacement with additional seating. Other work included the installation of new handrails and hangers and the recoding of cars and sets. The carriage numbers were kept, however the O (outer suburban) prefix was dropped. OD became D, while ONL and ON became N. The set numbers were reclassified from G1-30 to T100-130. G4 was the first to be converted (into T104). In 2010, sets being converted started receiving a full interior refurbishment as part of the program to refurbish all the Tangara carriages. In 2018, sets T14 and T121 (ex G21) both became mixtures of T set and ex-G set carriages, with both sets swapping two carriages with each other.

Upgrades in the 2010s 

In 2010, a refresh of the Tangaras commenced with the interiors repainted, and new seating upholstery and handrails fitted.

In July 2013, Sydney Trains trialled rearranging the seating on the upper and lower decks of two carriages. There were 16 fewer seats per carriage; 3x2 seats were replaced by 2x2 seats in one carriage (N5134 on set T78) while in the other carriage (N5131 on set T77) there are double seats on one side and a bench style seating on the other. Both carriages were later returned to the normal 3x2 arrangement.

In 2014, phase one of a technology upgrade program, aiming to improve reliability and upgrade ageing components, was underway. A contract for phase two of the program, aiming to extend the life of these trains and bring technology into line with newer trains was awarded to UGL Limited in August 2015. This was expected to be completed by July 2018. The expected completion date was revised to 2019, however as of February 2023 only 2 sets have entered service with the second phase upgrades.

The first phase of the program involved upgrading the passenger doors to cut down on vandalism, as the steel panels on the original doors were prone to being kicked out by vandals. The door kicking incidents often led to unnecessary delays as the guard had to lock off the affected carriage. The new lightweight passenger doors have a similar design to the doors on the M sets. This phase of the project was completed at the end of July 2016. The first set to receive the new doors was T96, in October 2014.

The second phase of the program was initially set to include destination indicators and digital voice announcements, which were installed in T72 and T106, were not installed in other sets due to delays and issues with the DVA system. The upgrade still went ahead however, with vestibules given modifications including marked priority seating and Automatic Train Protection (ATP). The first sets with this revised phase 2 upgrade, T52 and T73, re-entered service on 12 November 2021. As of 26 February 2022, sixteen sets have entered service with the upgrade.

The program includes overhauling air conditioning units and windscreen wiper units, replacing passenger side doors, train operating systems and driver's desks.

Other anti-vandal improvements included the introduction of 'Mousetrap' sensors. Trialed in 2015, these sensors are able to detect vapors from strong permanent markers and spray paint; triggering an in-built camera feed which is relayed to Sydney Trains staff as well as the Police Transport Command. They were then installed in most converted G sets.

Service

Lines serviced 
The Tangaras usually operate on the following lines: 
T1 North Shore & Western Line: Emu Plains to City via Parramatta, City to Berowra or Hornsby via Gordon
T4 Eastern Suburbs & Illawarra Line: Bondi Junction to Waterfall & Cronulla via Hurstville & Sutherland
T7 Olympic Park Line: Lidcombe to Olympic Park
T9 Northern Line: Gordon to Hornsby via Strathfield
South Coast Line: Waterfall & Thirroul to Port Kembla

Since 2013, their operation on Sector 2 has ended timetable services with all of them being displaced to Sector 1 since A sets do not operate on that sector.

Incidents

Wentworthville derailment 
Driving trailer car D6127 and motor car N5127 were both involved in the Wentworthville train derailment on 27 December 1989, the first major accident involving the Tangara fleet. D6127 was written off, having collided with the platform. N5127 was sent to Dunheved on the Ropes Creek line for training fire fighters, along with S Set car C3866.

Vineyard collision 
The first 3 cars derailed in a zig-zag format, starting a nearby grassfire.

Carriage pierced by guard rail 
During evening peak on 15 January 2014, motor car N5222 on set T10 was pierced by a guard rail near Edgecliff railway station while on a service to Cronulla. Issues with the train were already developing on the previous run, triggering wheelslip sensors on the train multiple times. As the train entered the Eastern Suburbs Line, a strong burning smell was reported at several stations. It was later revealed that an incorrectly repaired axle on N5222 led to the force of the 440-tonne train picking up the piece of guard rail.

Kembla Grange Derailment 
On 20 October 2021 at 4:09 AM, Tangara set T42 derailed near Kembla Grange station on a level crossing. It was caused by a car that was stolen and driven up the rail corridor near the railway crossing. Car D6212 fell onto its side and car N5212 also derailed, while cars N5211 and D6211 did not derail and only had minor damage. There were no serious injuries or deaths as a result of this incident, however two passengers, as well as the guard and the driver, were hospitalised to be checked. T sets usually don't operate through Kembla Grange, however due to industrial action on the day of the incident banning the usual H sets, they were used.

4D 

A train bearing strong resemblance to a Tangara, known as the 4D, was built by A Goninan & Co in 1991 for the Public Transport Corporation. Although outwardly similar to the Tangaras it was mechanically very different being built to be compatible with the Comeng trains operated in Melbourne. It was included in the sale of Hillside Trains to Connex Melbourne in August 1999. It wasn't successful and after spending large periods out of service, being withdrawn in December 2002 and stored at Newport Workshops.
The 4D was bought by CityRail for parts and then scrapped in March 2006 by them at Sims Metal, Brooklyn, Victoria. The G sets' cab ends have a design similar to the 4D, with the bottom part being bent inwards.

Notes

References

Further reading

External links 

T set technical diagrams Transport for NSW
G set technical diagrams

Double-decker EMUs
Electric multiple units of New South Wales
Sydney Trains
Train-related introductions in 1988
1500 V DC multiple units of New South Wales